The 2010–11 Dallas Stars season was the 44th season for the National Hockey League franchise that was established on June 5, 1967, and 18th season since the franchise relocated to Dallas to start the 1993–94 NHL season. The Stars posted a regular season record of 42 wins, 29 losses and 11 overtime/shootout losses for 95 points. Despite having a winning record, the Stars failed to qualify for the Stanley Cup playoffs for the third consecutive season.

Off-season
The Stars decided to not re-sign unrestricted free agent goalie Marty Turco. The Stars signed free agent goalie Andrew Raycroft, formerly of the Vancouver Canucks, as a likely backup goaltender to Kari Lehtonen. Mike Modano left the team to sign with the Detroit Red Wings.

Regular season
On February 21, 2011, among an extended skid, general manager Joe Nieuwendyk traded defenseman Matt Niskanen and forward James Neal to the Pittsburgh Penguins in exchange for defenseman Alex Goligoski. After failing to make the playoffs by losing their final game of the season, Marc Crawford was fired as head coach.

Playoffs
The Stars failed to qualify for the playoffs. With 95 points, the Stars tied a record set by the 2006–07 Colorado Avalanche for the team with the highest point total in a season that failed to make the playoffs. This record was later surpassed by the 2014–15 Boston Bruins who failed to make the playoffs with 96 points.

Schedule and results

Pre-season

Regular season

Standings

Divisional standings

Conference standings

Player statistics

Skaters

Note: GP = Games played; G = Goals; A = Assists; Pts = Points; +/− = Plus/minus; PIM = Penalty minutes

Goaltenders
Note: GP = Games played; TOI = Time on ice (minutes); W = Wins; L = Losses; OT = Overtime losses; GA = Goals against; GAA= Goals against average; SA= Shots against; SV= Saves; Sv% = Save percentage; SO= Shutouts

†Denotes player spent time with another team before joining Stars. Stats reflect time spent with the Stars only.
‡Traded mid-season
Bold/italics denotes franchise record

Awards and records

Awards

Records

Milestones

Transactions 

The Stars have been involved in the following transactions during the 2010–11 season.

Trades

Free agents acquired

Free agents lost

Claimed via waivers

Lost via waivers

Lost via retirement

Player signings

Draft picks 
The Stars' picks at the 2010 NHL Entry Draft in Los Angeles, California.

See also 
 2010–11 NHL season

Farm teams

References

External links 
2010–11 Dallas Stars season at ESPN
2010–11 Dallas Stars season at Hockey Reference

Dallas Stars seasons
D
D
Dallas Stars
Dallas Stars
2010s in Dallas